TP Northern Odisha Distribution Limited or TPNODL was incorporated as a Public Sector Company of Government of Odisha on 19 November 1997 to carry out the distribution and retail supply business of electricity in the entire North Eastern Odisha, 5 Districts of Odisha; Balasore, Mayurbhanj, Keonjhar, Jajpur, and Bhadrak. TP Northern Odisha Distribution Limited was incorporated under the Companies Act 1956 and started functioning as a subsidiary of Tata Power and Grid Corporation of Odisha (GRIDCO), a Government of Odisha Power Utility, from 26 November 1998 under Distribution and Retail Supply License.

References

External links

 Official Website of North Eastern Electricity Supply Company Of Odisha

Energy in Odisha
State agencies of Odisha
State electricity agencies of India
Electric-generation companies of India
Energy companies established in 1997
Indian companies established in 1997
Government-owned companies of India
1997 establishments in Orissa